Hubert Blaine  Sr. (a.k.a. Hubert Wolfstern, Hubert B. Wolfe + 666 Sr., Hubert Blaine Wolfe+585 Sr., and Hubert Blaine Wolfe+590 Sr., among others) is the abbreviated name of a German-born American typesetter who has held the record for the longest personal name ever used. Hubert's name is made up from 27 names. Each of his 26 given names starts with a different letter of the English alphabet in alphabetical order; these are followed by an enormously long single-word surname.  The exact length and spelling of his name has been a subject of considerable confusion due in part to its various renderings over the years, many of which are plagued by typographical errors.  One of the longest and most reliable published versions, with a 666-letter surname, is as follows:

While the Guinness World Records verified the version as follows:

Biography

 was born in Bergedorf (now part of Hamburg), Germany, and later emigrated to the United States, settling in Philadelphia. His birthdate has been given as February 29, 1904, but he was also reported to be age 47 in a 1964 wire story, and Philadelphia County death records list a birthdate of August 4, 1914. He became a typesetter according to Bennett Cerf.

His name first attracted attention when it appeared in the 1938 Philadelphia telephone directory on page 1292, column 3, line 17, and in a court order of judge John Boyle of May 25, 1938: ", Jr., etc., vs. Yellow Cab Co., petition for compromise settlement granted"—with speculation that the case was settled because "they couldn't pronounce it".

A son, Hubert Blaine  Jr., was born in Philadelphia in 1952, and was able to pronounce his surname by age three. Family letterhead used the form "Hubert Blaine ".

When Inquirer journalist Frank Brookhouser omitted the letter "u" in reporting a 1952 Philadelphia voter registration under the 35-letter version of the surname, 's prompt correction was carried by Time and passed on to other outlets. Philadelphia's business computers used an abbreviated form on the city's voting registration books; the utility company, however, when told he would not pay his bill unless his name was right, began spelling it properly, on three lines. Brookhouser later responded by tributing the correctly spelled  as the exemplar Philadelphian named in the first sentence of his Our Philadelphia, comparing him to another local typesetter, Benjamin Franklin:

The executive secretary-treasurer of the American Name Society also provided a 163-letter spelling of the surname: "", stating that this was his "full name as given ... at birth on the envelope". This spelling was reproduced verbatim by the Maryland and Delaware Genealogist.

He explained to reporter Norman Goldstein, "When somebody calls my name, I don't have any trouble finding out who they mean ... I don't like being part of the common herd." The article includes a 666-letter version of the surname, though individual newspapers which ran it made numerous typographical errors, making it difficult to ascertain which renderings (if any) are correct.

Logologist Dmitri Borgmann devoted several pages to the unusually long name in his 1965 book Language on Vacation.  According to Borgmann, the name had never before appeared correctly and in full in any book, and its bearer himself usually signed his name as "Hubert B. Wolfe + 666, Sr.".  The long-form version reproduced in Language on Vacation is said to have come from 's 1963 Christmas card, and to be the form in which it was submitted to the Associated Press for publication.

Onomastician Elsdon C. Smith, writing in Treasury of Name Lore, provides a 161-letter version of the surname, "", but noted that its holder used only the 35-letter version in correspondence with him. Smith affirmed the personal name was the longest in the United States but implied that  was a publicity seeker for adopting it.

Between 1975 and 1985,  appeared in the Guinness Book of World Records as having the longest personal name, and was photographed for the book in front of a New York City marquee displaying his name, once again misspelled. He also made personal appearances in television shows based on the Guinness Book. By 1983, only the 35-letter form of the name appeared in the book.  Various editions claimed he had recently shortened his surname to "Wolfe+585, Senior" or to "Wolfe+590, Senior".  By the 1990 edition, the "longest name" category had disappeared altogether. Since 2021, the name is present in category "Longest personal name".

 has also been catalogued by logologist Gyles Brandreth and by The Book of Useless Information.

Origin and translation of surname
 claimed that his great-grandfather composed the surname in the 19th century, when German Jews were obliged to take a second name.  In some printings of the above-noted AP wire story,  himself provided the following explanation of his prodigious surname:

Dmitri Borgmann, a fellow emigrant from Germany, held that the 666-letter version of the surname was untranslatable due to its numerous grammatical and spelling errors, but offered his own paraphrase:

The New Dictionary of American Family Names translates the 35-letter form as "a descendant of Wolfeschlegelstein (one who prepared wool for manufacture on a stone), of the house of Bergerdorf (mountain village)"; the Fairleigh Dickinson University Names Institute gives "wolf slayer who lives in the stone house in the mountain village".

See also
 , the name of a large village and community on the island of Anglesey in Wales that is the longest place name in Europe and the second longest official one-word place name in the world.
  und , the name of a state law in Germany (passed in 1999, repealed in 2013) that exhibited an extreme degree of the type of compounding of nouns that can occur in Germanic languages
 , the Māori name for a hill in New Zealand
 Mary Abigail  Wiggin Pukui, a Hawaiian scholar, author, composer, hula expert and educator
 Jugemu, Japanese folk-tale about a boy with a ridiculously long given name
 John Jacob Jingleheimer Schmidt, a U.S. and Canada traditional children's song about a person with a long Germanic name
 Johann Gambolputty de von Ausfern-schplenden-schiltter-crasscrenbon-fried-digger-dingle-dangle-dongle-dungle-burstein-von-knacker-thrasher-apple-banger-horowitz-ticolensic-grander-knotty-spelltinkle-grandlich-grumblemeyer-spelterwasser-kurstlich-himbleeisen-bahnwagen-gutenabend-bitte-ein-nürnburger-bratwustle-gerspurten-mitz-weimache-luber-hundsfut-gumeraber-shönendanker-kalbsfleisch-mittler-aucher von Hautkopft of Ulm, a character in a sketch from the Monty Python's Flying Circus episode "It's the Arts".
 Leone Sextus Denys Oswolf Fraudatifilius Tollemache-Tollemache de Orellana Plantagenet Tollemache-Tollemache, British Army captain in World War I.

References

External links

1914 births
1997 deaths
20th-century German Jews
German emigrants to the United States
Jews from Hamburg
Longest things
Names by person
People from Hamburg
People from Philadelphia
Typesetters
Year of birth uncertain